is a district located in Hidaka Subprefecture, Hokkaido, Japan.

As of 2004, the district has an estimated population of 5,872 and a density of 20.68 persons per km2. The total area is 283.93 km2.

Towns and villages
Erimo

Districts in Hokkaido